Dawid Kudła (born 21 March 1992) is a Polish professional footballer who plays as a goalkeeper for GKS Katowice.

Career
Kudła joined Zagłębie Sosnowiec in June 2017. On 17 June 2019 the club announced, that Kudła's contract had been terminated by mutual consent.

On 11 July 2019, he signed two years with Górnik Zabrze with an option for one further year.

References

External links
  
 

1992 births
Living people
Polish footballers
Association football goalkeepers
Zagłębie Sosnowiec players
Pogoń Szczecin players
Górnik Zabrze players
GKS Katowice players
Ekstraklasa players
I liga players
II liga players
Sportspeople from Ruda Śląska